"Flip Reverse" is a song by ten-piece hip-hop group Blazin' Squad, released as the second single from their second studio album, Now or Never.

Background
Although initially against releasing the song as a single, East West released "Flip Reverse" as the second single from Now or Never on 3 November 2003. It became the group's last single to be released on the discontinued cassette format. Released a week prior to Now or Never, the single peaked at #2 on the UK Singles Chart on the week of release. The radio edit of "Flip Reverse" cuts around twenty seconds of instrumental music from the intersection of the song.

Music video
The music video for "Flip Reverse" premiered in September 2003, at a total length of two minutes and fifty-six seconds. The video focuses on the group performing the song in a crowded club, surrounded by a group of girls. The video also shows scenes of members of the band break dancing, and leaving the club with a gaggle of girls following behind. As of 2012, "Flip Reverse" has become the group's most-played video on UK music channels, receiving nearly twice as many plays as "Crossroads", the group's only number-one single.

Track listing
 Digital single
 "Flip Reverse" (Original Edit) - 3:13
 "Nothing Like This" - 3:36
 "Who's It Gonna Be?" - 3:15

 UK CD #1
 "Flip Reverse" (Original Edit) - 3:13
 "Nothing Like This" - 3:36
 "Who's It Gonna Be?" - 3:15
 "Flip Reverse" (CD-Rom Video) - 2:55
 "Flip Reverse" (Making of the Video) (CD-Rom Video) - 1:58

 UK CD #2
 "Flip Reverse" (Radio Edit) - 2:53
 "U Know What" - 5:01
 "Crossroads" (Live) (CD-Rom Video) - 6:52
 "Interactive Interview" (CD-Rom Video) - 1:37

 UK Cassette
 "Flip Reverse" (Radio Edit) - 2:53
 "Who's It Gonna Be?" - 3:15

Charts

References

2003 singles
2003 songs
Blazin' Squad songs
East West Records singles
Songs written by Christian Ballard (songwriter)